LaurieBeth Hager is an American politician and academic administrator serving as a member of the North Dakota House of Representatives from the 21st district. She assumed office on December 1, 2018.

Education 
Hager attended Finley Sharon High School in Finley, North Dakota. She earned a Bachelor of Science degree in psychology from the University of North Dakota and a Master of Science in counseling education from North Dakota State University.

Career 
Prior to entering politics, Hager worked as a counselor and student affairs administrator at the North Dakota State University. In the 2018 election for district 21 in the North Dakota House of Representatives, Hager and Mary Schneider defeated their Republican opponents.

References 

Living people
People from Steele County, North Dakota
Women state legislators in North Dakota
University of North Dakota alumni
North Dakota State University alumni
North Dakota State University faculty
21st-century American politicians
21st-century American women politicians
Year of birth missing (living people)
American women academics
Democratic Party members of the North Dakota House of Representatives